Aaron Walter Hill (born March 21, 1982) is an American former professional baseball second baseman. Hill was drafted by the Toronto Blue Jays in the first round (13th overall) of the 2003 MLB draft and made his Major League Baseball (MLB) debut with them in 2005. He also played for the Arizona Diamondbacks, Milwaukee Brewers, Boston Red Sox and San Francisco Giants. Hill is one of only five players in MLB history to hit for the cycle twice in one season.

Early life
At age 15, Hill and friends were participating in a soccer tournament in Park City, Utah. While on their way to a round of golf, a college student narrowly missed Hill's car and slammed into his mother's car following behind him. Hill's mother, Vicki, was killed as a result.

College career
Hill was originally drafted by the Anaheim Angels in the seventh round (200th overall) of the 2000 MLB draft. Hill turned down the offer, opting to attend Louisiana State University and play for the varsity Tigers baseball team. While at LSU, Hill posted a career .335 batting average with 23 home runs and 150 RBIs. In 2001, he played collegiate summer baseball with the Wareham Gatemen of the Cape Cod Baseball League, and was named a league all-star and the playoff MVP of Wareham's league championship team.

Professional career

Toronto Blue Jays
Hill was Toronto's first draft pick (13th overall) in the 2003 MLB draft, and he made his major league debut on May 20, 2005 against the Washington Nationals, after being called up from the minor leagues a day earlier as an injury replacement for Corey Koskie. Hill would finish the game 2-for-4, and he recorded an RBI triple off Nationals pitcher Claudio Vargas for his first career hit as the Blue Jays won, 6–1. Although he was brought up as a shortstop, Hill appeared as a third baseman, a designated hitter, and as a second baseman during the course of the season. He finished the 2005 season with a .274 batting average, .348 OBP, and 25 doubles in 361 at-bats. After the trade of Orlando Hudson to the Arizona Diamondbacks, Hill became the starting second baseman for the Blue Jays in 2006, but was moved back to shortstop mid-season after the demotion of Russ Adams. After experiencing defensive struggles at shortstop, he was then moved back to second base, with John McDonald taking over at shortstop.

On May 29, 2007, in a game at home against the New York Yankees with Andy Pettitte pitching, Hill became only the second player in Blue Jays history to accomplish a "straight steal" of home.

Hill won a Fielding Bible Award at second base for his fielding excellence in 2007.

On April 4, 2008, Hill agreed to a four-year, $12 million deal that included a club option that could have run through the 2014 season. The contract would have been worth as much as $38 million if Toronto kept Hill in the fold for all seven years of the deal.

On May 29, Hill suffered a Grade II concussion in a collision with teammate David Eckstein during a game against the Oakland Athletics. Hill missed the remainder of the season.

Hill returned from his concussion during spring training. On July 5, 2009, Hill was selected by managers and players to take part in the All-Star Game in St. Louis. Hill finished the 2009 season with 37 doubles, 36 home runs, 108 runs batted in, and a batting average of .286 in 158 games. After the season, Hill received the AL Comeback Player of the Year Award.  He was voted the Blue Jays Player of the Year. He was also honored with his second Fielding Bible Award.

Prior to the first game of the 2011 season, the Blue Jays announced that they had declined the three option years on Hill's contract. Hill was placed on the 15-day disabled list on April 24, retroactive to April 20, with a strained hamstring.

Arizona Diamondbacks

On August 23, 2011, Hill and John McDonald were traded to the Arizona Diamondbacks in exchange for second baseman Kelly Johnson. Hill hit his first home run as a Diamondback on August 28 against the San Diego Padres, a two-run shot to right field off starter Cory Luebke.

In Game 4 of the 2011 NLDS, Hill hit his first postseason home run. The Diamondbacks would, however, lose the division series to the Milwaukee Brewers in 5 games.

After the 2011 season, the Diamondbacks resigned Hill to a two-year, $11 million contract extension.

On April 7, 2012, Hill, who got moved up in the order to the #2 spot, went 2-for-4 with 3 RBI and two home runs against the Giants in the first and second innings, both off of Madison Bumgarner. This came after going 0-for-4 on Opening Day while hitting eighth. The D-Backs went on to win 5–4.

On June 18, 2012, Hill hit for the cycle against the Seattle Mariners. On June 29, 2012, Hill again hit for the cycle against the Milwaukee Brewers, becoming the first player to hit for the cycle twice in one season since Babe Herman in 1931 for the Brooklyn Robins and the first modern-era player to do so in the same month (John Reilly hit cycles a week apart in 1883).

Milwaukee Brewers
On January 30, 2016, Hill was traded to the Milwaukee Brewers along with Chase Anderson, Isan Diaz, and cash considerations for Jean Segura and Tyler Wagner. On May 7, 2016, Hill had a career day at the plate hitting three home runs and driving in seven runs. His home runs included a game-tying home run in the eighth inning and a go-ahead grand slam in the tenth inning. Hill had only hit three home runs in his previous 82 games at the time.

Boston Red Sox
On July 7, 2016, the Brewers traded Hill to the Boston Red Sox for Aaron Wilkerson and Wendell Rijo.

San Francisco Giants
On February 17, 2017, Hill signed a minor league contract with the San Francisco Giants. Through 80 plate appearances, Hill managed just a .132 batting average with a home run, 7 RBI, and a strikeout to walk ratio of 13/11. He was designated for assignment on June 24, and was released five days later.

Awards

2001–01 Collegiate Baseball Freshman All-American
2002–02 United States National Team Member
2003 – Southeastern Conference Player of the Year
2003 – Baseball America First-Team All-American
2003 – Collegiate Baseball Second-Team All-American
2003 – USA Today Second-Team All-American
2003 – ABCA Second-Team All-American
2003 – ABCA First-Team All-South Region
2003 – NCAA Baton Rouge Regional All-Tournament Team
2003 – SEC All-Tournament Team
2003 – Short Season All-Star Team (Baseball America)
2003 – Prospect of the year (New York–Penn League – A)
2003 – New York–Penn League All-Star Team (A) (Shortstop)
2004 – Eastern League All-Star Team (AA) (Shortstop)
2004 – MVP of All-Star Futures Game
2007 – Fielding Bible Award at second base
2009 – representative of American League at 2009 MLB All-Star Game
2009 – American League 2009 Comeback Player of the Year
2009 – American League second baseman Silver Slugger Award
2009 – Fielding Bible Award at second base

See also
 List of Major League Baseball players to hit for the cycle
 List of Silver Slugger Award winners at second base

References

External links

1982 births
Living people
Sportspeople from Visalia, California
Baseball players from California
American expatriate baseball players in Canada
Major League Baseball second basemen
Major League Baseball shortstops
Major League Baseball third basemen
American League All-Stars
Silver Slugger Award winners
Toronto Blue Jays players
Arizona Diamondbacks players
Milwaukee Brewers players
Boston Red Sox players
San Francisco Giants players
LSU Tigers baseball players
Auburn Doubledays players
Dunedin Blue Jays players
Grand Canyon Rafters players
New Hampshire Fisher Cats players
Syracuse SkyChiefs players
Reno Aces players
Wareham Gatemen players